I Got the Hook-Up is the soundtrack  for the film of the same name. It was released on April 7, 1998, by No Limit Records and featured production by Beats By the Pound, Bud'da and RZA, among others. The soundtrack was a huge success, debuting at #3 on the Billboard 200 and #1 on the Top R&B/Hip-Hop Albums. Shortly after its release, it was certified platinum by the RIAA. The soundtrack featured the hit single "I Got the Hook-Up!", which made it to #16 on the Billboard Hot 100 and #11 on the Hot R&B/Hip-Hop Singles & Tracks. According to Master P's long time friend BOZ, the soundtrack was certified 3× platinum in 3 months of its release.

Track listing

Charts

Weekly charts

Year-end charts

Certifications

See also
List of number-one R&B albums of 1998 (U.S.)

References

Comedy film soundtracks
Hip hop soundtracks
1998 soundtrack albums
Albums produced by RZA
Albums produced by Soopafly
No Limit Records soundtracks
Priority Records soundtracks
Gangsta rap soundtracks